Radiodiffusion Nationale (fr: national broadcasting) may refer to:
Radiodiffusion Nationale (France), France (1939-45)
Radiodiffusion Nationale Belge (RNB), a Free Belgian radio broadcaster based in the Belgian Congo
Radiodiffusion Nationale Tchadienne, Chad
Radiodiffusion Nationale, Burkina Faso
Société Nationale de Radiodiffusion et de Télévision, Morocco
Entreprise nationale de Radiodiffusion sonore, Algeria
Burundi National Radio and Television (Radiodiffusion Nationale de la République du Burundi), Burundi